The discography of the American punk rock band Rise Against consists of nine studio albums, two compilation album, eleven extended plays, twenty singles, four promotional singles, two documentaries, and twenty-five music videos. The band was formed in 1999, under the original name Transistor Revolt. After signing a recording contract with Fat Wreck Chords, they changed their name to Rise Against, and released The Unraveling in 2001, and Revolutions Per Minute in 2003. Rise Against switched to Geffen Records the following year, and made its major record label debut with Siren Song of the Counter Culture. In addition to becoming the band's first album to reach the Billboard 200, where it peaked at number 136, the success of the singles "Give It All" and "Swing Life Away" helped Rise Against achieve mainstream appeal.

The follow-up album was The Sufferer & the Witness in 2006. It peaked at number ten on the Billboard 200, and was the band's first album to chart in other countries. Rise Against's popularity continued to grow with its fifth album Appeal to Reason, released in 2008 by DGC and Interscope Records. The album charted highly, and sold over 482,000 copies by 2011. The third single from Appeal to Reason, "Savior", held the record for the most consecutive weeks spent on both the Hot Rock Songs and Alternative Songs charts, with sixty-three and sixty-five weeks respectively. Endgame, Rise Against's next album, was released in 2011. Continuing on the success of Appeal to Reason, it charted within the top ten in several countries, and remains Rise Against's most successful album chart-wise. After the release of the compilation album Long Forgotten Songs: B-Sides & Covers 2000–2013, the band recorded The Black Market in 2014, which reached number three in the United States, and was the third consecutive studio album to reach number one on the Canadian Albums Chart. Rise Against's eighth studio album, Wolves, was released in 2017, and their ninth album, Nowhere Generation, was released in 2021.

Albums

Studio albums

Compilation albums

Extended plays

Singles

Promotional singles

Other charted songs

Videography

Documentaries

Music videos

Notes

References

External links
 Rise Against at AllMusic
 Rise Against at Discogs

Punk rock group discographies
Discographies of American artists
Discography